Post Mortem was an American thrash metal band, formed in 1982 in suburban Boston, Massachusetts. The band also helped pioneer the underground subgenre of death metal.

History 
The band formed when its members were still in high school. They rehearsed every day, often rushing home to write music after classes. John McCarthy penned the personal songs while drummer Rick McIver wrote the gore lyrics. John Alexander helped write most of the songs. "Our whole concept was that we honestly didn't give a fuck. That's why we're lumped in with punk rock as well as metal," McCarthy said, adding, "It's much better to piss off people who think they're pissed off than to piss off your grandma or your mother or your father."

Post Mortem's debut album, Coroner's Office, was released in 1986. Coroner's Office continues to find new listeners and is now as remembered for its unusual styling and flirtation with jazz and punk. The album proved very influential, as it brought musical experimentation common in metal among bands like Cephalic Carnage and The Dillinger Escape Plan.
 
The band consists of John McCarthy (vocals), John Alexander (guitar), Mark Kelley (bass), and Rick "Ricky Magic" McIver (drums). Contrary to popular belief, Post Mortem were not named after the Slayer song, which was released in 1986.

Seth Putnam, vocalist for Anal Cunt, almost joined Post Mortem a few times, but did not actually do so until 1990 after Anal Cunt's first brief breakup. Putnam played various shows with the band and recorded one song with them; there are also live tapes and rehearsal tapes that exist with him on vocals. They did a tour in January 1991 that was supposed to be with Yugoslavian band Patareni but they could not leave their country. They did some more local shows and prepared for a new album until Putnam quit in 1992. After the death of their previous frontman John McCarthy, Putnam gave an interview and was asked about him. He said: "[McCarthy] was getting an SSI cheque and getting drunk on Listerine and shit like that. But I was surprised when he died. The strangest thing was that he was a grandfather at age 40. Even when he first had a kid I thought it was strange. He was one of my best friends of all time. I could say bad things about him but I won't because the good times outweigh the bad. In 2008, we played a show in California with Anal Blast and The Meat Shits. People were taking bets if I would die first or Don Decker from Anal Blast. Don died like a year later." Putnam also did vocals on the song "Oh So Evil" on Post Mortem's Message from the Dead album.

Many metal bands have acknowledged the influence of Post Mortem, like Cianide, Grief (who covered the entire Coroner's Office album), Disharmonic Orchestra, who covered "(It's Just) A Thought", and Anal Cunt (who covered Post Mortem's "1066").

Members

Current members 
Mirai Kawashima – vocals
John Alexander – guitar
Mark Kelley – bass
Rick "Ricky Magic" McIver – drums

Founding members 
Norman McIver – vocals
Tom Nelligan – guitar
Mark Kelley – bass
Rick "Ricky Magic" McIver – drums

Notable past members 
 John McCarthy – vocals (deceased 2009)
 Seth Putnam (Anal Cunt) (deceased 2011)
 Michelle Meldrum (Phantom Blue and Meldrum) (deceased 2008)
 Chris Jordan – vocals
 Rich Goyette – guitar

Discography 
1982 "Run Amok" – cassette
1983 "Punk After Death" – cassette (recorded in 1982)
1985 "The Dead Shall Rise" – cassette
1985 "Death to the Masses" – cassette
1986 "Turkey on Your Nose..." – cassette
1986 "Speed Metal Hell II" – various artists
1986 "Thrash Metal Attack!" – various artists
1986 "Coroner's Office" – debut album (recorded in 1985)
1987 "The Missing Link" – EP
1988 "Beatings are in Order" – full-length album
1989 "Festival of Fun" – full-length album
1990 "Ring Around the Rectum" – single
1990 "Seasoned NoSalt Makes My Beef Stew Taste Like My Beef Stew" – single
1991 "Killed by the Machinery of Sorrow" – compilation CD
1993 "Destined for Failure" – full-length album
1994 "Court Metrage" – various artists
1995 "Convolutions" – full-length album
2007 "Deterioration of the Flesh" – live and some previously unreleased material
2009 "Message from the Dead" – full-length album

References

External links
Official website
John McCarthy, at 40; was lead singer for local thrash rockers Post Mortem

American thrash metal musical groups
Heavy metal musical groups from Massachusetts
Musical groups established in 1982
1982 establishments in Massachusetts